In category theory, a branch of mathematics, a subcategory   of a category   is said to be isomorphism closed or replete if every -isomorphism  with  belongs to  This implies that both  and  belong to  as well. 

A subcategory that is isomorphism closed and full is called strictly full. In the case of full subcategories it is sufficient to check that every -object that is isomorphic to an -object is also an -object.

This condition is very natural. For example, in the category of topological spaces one usually studies properties that are invariant under homeomorphisms—so-called topological properties. Every topological property corresponds to a strictly full subcategory of

References

Category theory